"Everything Must Change" is a song by English singer Paul Young, released in November 1984 by CBS Records as the second single from his second album The Secret of Association. It was released in North America by Columbia Records in November 1985. The B-side was "Give Me My Freedom" also written by Young and Kewley. However, the single was also additionally released in the Netherlands and France in 1985 with the B-side a cover of Tom Waits' "Soldier's Things".

Track listings 
7" (CBS, A 4972, 1984)

 "Everything Must Change" – 5:30
 "Give Me My Freedom" – 3:25

7" (CBS A 6649, 1985, Netherlands & France)

 "Everything Must Change" – 5:23
 "Soldier's Things" – 6:21

7" promo (CBS, A 4972, 1984)

 "Everything Must Change" – 5:30
 "Everything Must Change" (Radio Edit) – 4:28

Double 7" (The Christmas Package) (CBS, DA 4972, 1984)

 "Everything Must Change"
 "Give Me My Freedom"
 "Everything Must Change" (Instrumental Version)
 Paul's Christmas Message
 "I Close My Eyes and Count to Ten" (Recorded Live)

12" (CBS, TA 4972 / A 12.4972, 1984)

 "Everything Must Change" (Extended Version) – 8:26
 "Give Me My Freedom" – 3:25

12" (CBS, A 12.6649, 1985, Netherlands & France)

 "Everything Must Change" (Extended Version) – 8:26
 "Soldier's Things" – 6:21

12" maxi (CBS, HUL 40086, 1984, South Africa)

 "Everything Must Change"
 "Wherever I Lay My Hat"
 "Love of the Common People"
 "Love Will Tear Us Apart"

Personnel 

 Paul Young – lead vocals
 George Chandler, Jimmy Chambers and Tony Jackson – backing vocals
 Ian Kewley – keyboards
 John Turnbull – guitar
 Pino Palladino – bass guitar
 B. J. Cole – pedal steel guitar
 Mark Pinder – drums, percussion

Charts

References 

1984 singles
Paul Young songs
CBS Records singles
Columbia Records singles
1984 songs